Thomas Arthur Connolly (October 5, 1899 – April 18, 1991) was an American prelate of the Roman Catholic Church. He served as the fifth bishop and first archbishop of the Archdiocese of Seattle from 1950 to 1975. Connolly previously served as an auxiliary bishop of the Archdiocese of San Francisco in California from 1939 to 1950.

Connolly supported the US civil rights movement, ecumenical programs, and labor rights issues. He attended the Second Vatican Council and guided the archdiocese through the 1960s.

Biography

Early life 
Thomas Connolly was born in San Francisco, California, to Thomas and Catherine (née Gilsenan) Connolly. He studied at St. Patrick Seminary in Menlo Park, California.

Priesthood 
Connolly was ordained to the priesthood for the Archdiocese of San Francisco on June 11, 1926. He then served as a curate at St. Rose Parish in Santa Rosa, California, and St. Mary Star of the Sea Parish in Sausalito, California. In 1930, Connolly was sent to Washington D.C. to attend the Catholic University of America, obtaining a Doctor of Canon Law degree in 1932. 

After his return to California, Connolly became secretary to Archbishop Edward Joseph Hanna in 1934 and chancellor of the archdiocese in 1935. He was named a domestic prelate by Pope Pius XI in 1936, and pastor of Mission San Francisco de Asís in 1939.

Auxiliary Bishop of San Francisco 
On June 10, 1939, Connolly was appointed as an auxiliary bishop of the Archdiocese of San Francisco and titular bishop of Sila by Pope Pius XII. He received his episcopal consecration on August 24, 1939, from Archbishop John Mitty, with Bishops Robert Armstrong and Thomas Gorman serving as co-consecrators. In 1941, Connolly was named vicar delegate to the Catholic chaplains serving the US Army and the US Navy in World War II along the US Pacific Coast.

Coadjutor Bishop, Bishop and Archbishop of Seattle 
Connolly was named coadjutor bishop of the Diocese of Seattle by Pius XII on February 28, 1948, with immediate right of succession to Bishop Gerald Shaughnessy, who had been in failing health for several years. Upon Shaughnessy's death on May 18, 1950, Connolly automatically became the fifth bishop of Seattle. When the Vatican elevated the diocese to an archdiocese on June 23, 1951, Connolly became its first archbishop.

During his tenure, Connolly became known as a "brick and mortar bishop" for his construction of hundreds of Catholic facilities to accommodate the post World War IIpopulation growth in the archdiocese. He renovated St. James Cathedral; established 43 new parishes; and built over 350 churches, schools, rectories, convents, parish halls and religious education centers. He became an assistant at the pontifical throne in 1959. Connolly attended all four sessions of the Second Vatican Council in Rome between 1962 and 1965. He was an outspoken supporter of the civil rights movement, ecumenism, and anti-abortion rights issues.

Retirement and legacy 
On February 13, 1975, Pope Paul VI accepted Connolly's resignation as archbishop of Seattle.  Thomas Connolly died on April 18, 1991 in Seattle. He is interred with past bishops of Seattle at Holyrood Catholic Cemetery in Shoreline, Washington.

References

1899 births
1991 deaths
Catholic University of America alumni
Clergy from San Francisco
American Roman Catholic clergy of Irish descent
Participants in the Second Vatican Council
20th-century Roman Catholic archbishops in the United States
Roman Catholic bishops of Seattle
Roman Catholic archbishops of Seattle
American military chaplains
World War II chaplains
Catholics from California